Legislation controlling tattooing varies among countries in Europe. In many countries there is no particular legislation. In countries that do have legal controls, they relate mainly to the minimum age of clients. Greece and Denmark impose further stipulations.

Legal controls by European country

References

Age and society
Tattooing and law
Law in Europe
Minimum ages